The following is a list of hospitals and clinics in Benin.  There were 819 medical facilities in Benin, as of 2019.

Abomey
The following hospitals are located in Abomey, Zou Department:
Abomey Centre Hospitalier Départemental, Public hospital, Zou Department
Abomey-Calavi Hôpital de Zone, Public hospital, Atlantique Department

Cotonou and suburbs
The following hospitals are located in Cotonou and suburbs, Littoral Department of Benin:

Alafia Hospital
Ave Maria Hospital
Azinnigbo
Bon Acceuil
Cabinet Medical Akperdje
Brown Private Hospitals
Cabinet Medical Bon Berger
Cabinet Medical Dary Jeanne
Cabinet Medical le Sacre Coeur
Cabinet Medical La Vie
Centre Medico Social Sainte Therese
Cabinet de Soins Bignon
Cabinet de Soins Esperanza
Cabinet de Soins St Jeans de Dieu
Cabinet de Sonte la Philanthrope
Cabinet St Raphael
Central Medical Les Palmiers
Centre Daccouchement et de Soins
Centre de Soins et d'Accouchement Sama
Centre National Hospitalier Universitaire
Centre National Hospitalier de Pneumo-Phtisiologie
Clinique Akpedj
Clinique Atlantique
Clinique du Golfe
Clinique Gynécologie Obstétrique
Clinique Kauzipate
Les Graces Hôpital
Mahouna Hôpital
Codjo Adjouavi Charlotte
Sean jean hospital
Julius Adeyemi Hospital
Cotonou Hospital
CS Peniel
Dispensaire de Cococodj
Jesus Est Capable
Keneya
 Ong Aide Humanitare
Ong Espoir Vidomegon Centre de Sante
Cocotiers Hôpital
Rosa Mystica
Syocmore Hospital
University Reference Hospital

Parakou
The following  hospitals are located in Parakou, Borgou Department:
Hopital Ahmadiyya Parakou
Parakou Hospital

Porto Novo
The following hospitals are located in Porto-Novo, the capital of Benin, Ouémé Department:
Adjohoun Hôpital de Zone
Amour Redempteur Hôpital
Auberge de l'Amour Redempteur
Clinique Louis Pasteur
Clinique St Enfant Jesus
Clinique Saint Raphael
El Fateh Hôpital
Hôpital-Djéregbé
Hopital Amadiyya Porto Novo
Oueme-Plateau Centre Hospitalier Départemental

References

 
Benin
Benin
Hospitals